The Madhava Perumal Temple is dedicated to Hindu deity Vishnu, located in Mylapore, Chennai, in the South Indian state of Tamil Nadu. Constructed in the Dravidian style of architecture, dedicated to Vishnu, who is worshipped as Madhava Perumal and his consort Lakshmi as Amirtavalli. The temple is believed to be the birthplace of Peyalvar, one of the first three of the twelve Alvar saints of the 6th-9th century CE.

The temple is open from 7 a.m. to 11 a.m. and 5 p.m. to 8 p.m and has six daily rituals at various times of the day. The temple is maintained and administered by the Hindu Religious and Endowment Board of the Government of Tamil Nadu.

Legend
In Hindu mythology, during the churning of the ocean of milk, Vishnu is believed to have instructed his consort Lakshmi to reach the hermitage of Sage Bhrigu. The sage was engaged in a penance to gain a daughter, and accepted the girl Lakshmi. The presiding deity, Madhava Perumal, is believed to have married goddess Amritavalli, the daughter of sage Bhrigu, and thus gained the epithet 'Kalyana Perumal' (The great wedding deity).

The temple is believed to be the birthplace of Peyalvar, one of the first three of the twelve Alvar saints of the 6th-9th century CE. The renowned Alvar was believed to have come to earth from the  well called Manikairavam inside the temple premises. In the contemporary period, the temple is maintained and administered by the Hindu Religious and Charitable Endowments Department of the Government of Tamil Nadu.

The temple
The temple is built in Dravidian architecture and has two precincts. It is located in Mylapore, a suburb in Chennai, the capital of the South Indian state of Tamil Nadu. The presiding deity is housed in the sanctum and is an image made of granite. The deity is seen in seated posture with images of Sridevi and Bhumidevi on either side. There is a small shrine for Varaha, an avatar of Vishnu, located behind the central shrine. The shrine of Garuda facing Madhava Perumal, the demigod-eagle mount (vahana) of Vishnu, is located axial to the central shrine. The central shrine is approached through a worship hall and a narrow ardha mandapam. The flagpost is located behind the shrine of Garuda, axial to the central shrine and the gateway tower. There are images of Alvars in the worship hall on both sides and the shrine of Amritavalli is located on the western side of the temple in the second precinct.

Worship practices and festivals

The temple is open from 7 a.m. to 11 a.m. and 5 p.m. to 8 p.m. The temple priests perform the puja (rituals) during festivals and on a daily basis. As at other Vishnu temples of Tamil Nadu, the priests belong to the Sri Vaishnava community. The temple rituals are performed four times a day: Ushathkalam at 8 a.m., Kalasanthi at 10:00 a.m., Sayarakshai at 5:00 p.m. and Ardha Jamam at 7:00 p.m. Each ritual has three steps: alangaram (decoration), neivethanam (food offering) and deepa aradanai (waving of lamps) for both Kudamudakoothan and his consort  Amirtavalli. During the worship, religious instructions in the Vedas (sacred text) are recited by priests, and worshippers prostrate themselves in front of the temple mast. There are weekly, monthly and fortnightly rituals performed in the temple.

During the Magam day of the Tamil month Maasi, the festival deity of Madha Perumal is taken in a float in temple tank. During the subsequent days, the festival deities of Peyalvar is taken in the float. The festival is one of the major festivals of the temple, which was not celebrated for a decade before 2011. It is believed that all the rivers converge in the tank during the auspicious day. The annual festival, Brahmostavam, of the temple is celebrated during the Tamil month of Chittirai (March - April).

See also
 Heritage structures in Chennai
 Religion in Chennai

References

External links

Hindu temples in Chennai